Jiangsu Road Subdistrict is a subdistrict in Changning District, Shanghai, China. It is one of the busiest subdistricts in Changning District and consists of the main governmental headquarters of Changning District. The subdistrict is located in the eastern portion of the district, spanning  in area, and having a population of 51,883 as of the 2010 Chinese Census. It is home to Jiangsu Road Station.

History 
The subdistrict was founded in 1960, and named after , which passes through it.

By the end of 1992, the subdistrict comprised 22 residential communities, and was home to 68,096 people, living in 23,800 households.

By 1995, its population was about 72,500 people.

By 2004, the subdistrict was divided into 13 residential communities, as it is today.

Administrative divisions 
Jiangsu Road Subdistrict is divided into 13 residential communities. It residential communities are as follows:

 Qishan Community
 Jiangsu Community
 Wancun Community
 Nanwang Community
 Dongbang Community
 Yusan Community
 Caojiayan Community
 Xibang Community
 Fushi Community
 Changxin Community
 Huashan Community
 Lixi Community
 Beiwang Community

References 

Changning District
Township-level divisions of Shanghai